The 2020 Delaware Senate election was held on November 3, 2020, concurrently with the elections for the Delaware House of Representatives, to elect members to the Delaware General Assembly. 11 of the 21 seats in the Delaware Senate are up for election. Primary elections were held on September 16, 2020.

Democrats increased their majority in the Senate by gaining two seats, winning 14 seats compared to 7 seats for the Republicans.

Retirements

Democrats
 District 1: Harris McDowell III retired.

Incumbents defeated

In primary elections
 District 13: Democrat David McBride lost renomination to Marie Pinkney, who went on to win the general election.

In the general election
 District 5: Republican Catherine Cloutier was defeated by Democrat Kyle Evans Gay.
 District 7: Republican Anthony Delcollo was defeated by Democrat Spiros Mantzavinos.

Predictions

Results summary

Statewide

District
Results of the 2020 Delaware State Senate election by district:

Closest races 
Seats where the margin of victory was under 10%:
  gain
  gain

Detailed results by State Senate District

District 1

District 5

District 7

District 8

District 9

District 12

District 13

District 14

District 15

District 19

District 20

References

External links
 
 
  (State affiliate of the U.S. League of Women Voters)
 

senate
2020
Delaware Senate